Jequiá da Praia is a municipality located in the coast of the Brazilian state of Alagoas. Its area is 339 km², and in 2005 it had a population of 12,926.

The municipal seat lies on the Jequiá River.
The municipality contains the  Lagoa do Jequiá Marine Extractive Reserve, created in 2002.

References

Populated coastal places in Alagoas
Municipalities in Alagoas